This list contains many notable near-Earth asteroids organised by their average distance from the Sun, and includes the planets and distances for comparability. It does not pretend to completeness.

References

Near-Earth Asteroids, distance